Grace Aluka (born 2 June 2003) is a Ugandan footballer who plays as a striker for FUFA Women Super League club Olila High School WFC and the Uganda women's national team.

Early life
Aluka was raised in Soroti and belongs to the Iteso.

Club career 
Aluka has played for Olila High School in Uganda.

International career 
Aluka represented Uganda at the 2020 African U-17 Women's World Cup Qualifying Tournament. She capped at senior level during the 2018 CECAFA Women's Championship, 2019 CECAFA Women's Championship, 2020 Olympic African Qualifiers. Aluka also represented Uganda Crested Cranes at the COSAFA Women Championships in Port Elizabeth in 2018.

International goals
Scores and results list Uganda goal tally first

References

External links 

2003 births
Living people
People from Soroti District
Ugandan women's footballers
Women's association football central defenders
Uganda women's international footballers
Teso people
21st-century Ugandan women